Voznesenovka is the name of several rural localities in Russia:
Voznesenovka, Ivanovsky District, Amur Oblast, a selo in Ivanovsky Selsoviet of Ivanovsky District, Amur Oblast
Voznesenovka, Romnensky District, Amur Oblast, a selo in Rogozovsky Selsoviet of Romnensky District, Amur Oblast